The 2017 Virsligas Winter Cup is the league cup's fifth season. It began on 14 January 2017. FK Liepāja are the defending champion.

Group stage

References

Virsligas Winter Cup
Virsligas Winter Cup